Dolní Věstonice is a municipality and village in Břeclav District in the South Moravian Region of the Czech Republic. It has about 300 inhabitants. It is known for the eponymous archaeological site.

Geography
Dolní Věstonice lies on the border between the Mikulov Highlands and Dyje–Svratka Valley. It is located on the shore of the Nové Mlýny reservoirs.

The municipality is partly located in the Pálava Protected Landscape Area. The area on the reservoir is protected as the Věstonice Reservoir Nature Reserve.

History

Prehistoric times

Dolní Věstonice is known for the Dolní Věstonice archaeological site. Approximately 25,000 years ago, during the Upper Paleolithic period of the Stone Age, a small settlement of mammoth hunters consisting of huts built with rocks and mammoth bones was founded on the site of what is now Dolní Věstonice. This is the oldest permanent human settlement that has ever been found. Numerous other archaeological discoveries point to extensive human habitation of the area in prehistoric times. The archaeological site is also known for finding Venus of Dolní Věstonice, one of the most important archaeological discoveries in Europe and one of the oldest and most famous art in the world.

9th–20th century
During the Great Moravia period, which lasted between the 9th and 10th centuries, a small Slavic gord was built here. The gord protected a ford on an important trade route.

The first written mention of Věstonice is from 1312. During the 13th century the place became inhabited by German colonists. In 1460, the village was promoted to a market town by King George of Poděbrady. From the beginning of the 16th century until their expulsion in 1622, the anabaptists settled here. They were famous for their high level of education and the establishment of wine cellars, which have survived to this day.

Until 1918, the village was part of the Austrian monarchy (Austria side after the compromise of 1867), in the Nikolsburg District, one of the 34 Bezirkshauptmannschaften in Moravia.

In 1938, it was occupied by the Nazi army as one of the municipalities in Sudetenland. The German speaking population was expelled in 1945 according to the Beneš decrees and replaced by Czech settlers.

Demographics

Economy
Dolní Věstonice is known for viticulture. The municipality lies in the Mikulovská wine subregion.

Sights
Tourist attractions follow the archaeological glory of the municipality. The archaeological site includes an outdoor exhibition. An educational archeological path leads from Dolní Věstonice to neighbouring Pavlov.

Remains of the gord rampart and floor plan of the church, which stood here until the early 13th century, are preserved.

References

External links

Photographs of the area and archaeological artefacts

Villages in Břeclav District
Stone Age Czech Republic
Archaeology of Moravia
Margraviate of Moravia